This article lists diplomatic missions resident in the Swiss Confederation and that are accredited to Switzerland. At present, the capital city of Bern hosts 88 embassies, while Geneva, which hosts the headquarters of the United Nations in Europe, hosts 53 missions, which are accredited to Switzerland as embassies. Several other countries have ambassadors accredited to Switzerland, with most being resident in Berlin, Brussels or Paris.

Embassies 
Bern

Geneva
(Missions to the United Nations accredited to Switzerland)

Representative offices 
 (Spain) - Delegation
 (Delegation)
 (Hong Kong Economic and Trade Office)
 (Macao Economic and Trade Office)
 (General Delegation of Palestine)

 (Representative Office)

Gallery

Consulates-General and Consulates

Basel 
 (Consulate)

Geneva

Lugano 

 (Consular office)

Sion 
 (Consular office)

Zürich

Accredited embassies

Closed missions

See also 
 List of diplomatic missions of Switzerland
 Foreign relations of Switzerland
 Visa requirements for Swiss citizens

Notes

References

External links 

 Foreign Representations in Switzerland
 Consular List

List
Switzerland diplomacy-related lists
Switzerland
Bern-related lists